The Penlee Quarry railway was a  narrow-gauge industrial railway serving the Penlee Quarry at Newlyn in Cornwall, England, UK. It was Cornwall's most westerly railway and one of the last operating narrow-gauge industrial railways in the UK.

History 
Mineral extraction at Penlee dates back to the early 19th century, when copper, zinc and rare minerals were mined. Stone quarrying was started by James Runnalls of Penzance, at a quarry near the Old Battery in 1879. The operations were transferred to the current site at the turn of the 20th century, becoming known as Gwavas Quarry. Penlee supplied mainly aggregate (crushed stone) but on occasion also supplied large chunks of stone as rock armour ("armourstone"). The full-scale aggregate operations ran throughout most of the century, reaching peak output in the 1960s and 1970s.

With production increasing, a  narrow-gauge railway was opened around 1900. This connected the quarry with the south pier of Newlyn harbour, approximately ½ mile away to the east. A steam locomotive named Koppel was purchased to work this line.  Internal combustion locomotives replaced steam from 1930 onwards.  Stone was shipped from Newlyn to destinations around the Bristol Channel and the south coast and in later years to as far afield as Germany.

The railway was more or less straight, apart from the curve on to the south pier at Newlyn. It was double track for most of the route, although at some point in the past it had been singled, the double track being reinstated as production increased in the later years. In the 1960s when a ship was being loaded, six locomotives were needed for operations, four higher-powered ones on the main line and two lower-powered ones shunting the empty tipper wagons through the two loading points. The empty trains were reversed back to the loading points from the harbour.

In 1973, the railway ceased operations and was replaced by an electrical
conveyor system using the same route. Operations at the quarry then slowed throughout the late 1970s and the 1980s, eventually coming to an end in 1989/90.

Present day 
Stone was supplied for a few isolated small contracts until 1994, since when the quarry has been dormant. There are now plans to use the quarry site as part of a marina and housing development. 

Penlee Quarry is a Site of Special Scientific Interest, designated in 1997, noted for its geological formations and igneous rocks.

Locomotives

See also

 British industrial narrow-gauge railways

References 

 
 Penlee Marina plans and quarry history, 2009. Retrieved on 2009-06-02

2 ft gauge railways in England
Industrial railways in England
Quarries in Cornwall
Rail transport in Cornwall
Railway lines closed in 1973
Sites of Special Scientific Interest in Cornwall
Sites of Special Scientific Interest notified in 1997
Newlyn